Xingtai East railway station is a railway station on the Beijing–Guangzhou–Shenzhen–Hong Kong high-speed railway located in Xingtai County, Xingtai, Hebei.

History
The station was opened on 26 December 2012, together with the Beijing-Zhengzhou section of the Beijing–Guangzhou–Shenzhen–Hong Kong high-speed railway.

Station layout

The station has 4 platforms (2 island platforms) and 6 tracks, of which 2 are through tracks. Platform 1 and 2 are for southbound trains and Platform 3 and 4 are for northbound trains. The station building is located to the east of the platforms.

See also 
Xingtai railway station

References

Railway stations in Hebei
Railway stations in China opened in 2012